Okolona High School is a public high school located in Okolona, Mississippi, United States. It serves grades 5–12. It is part of the Okolona Municipal Separate School District. The school nickname is "The Chieftains".  They used to boast athletic teams in track, tennis, baseball, softball, but now only boast football and basketball. They have a vocational-technical school, JMG, art classes, and a drama club.  Okolona High School also provides students with free after-school tutoring in English, Reading, Science, Math, SATP History, SATP English II, and SATP Algebra I and Algebra 2

Notable alumni
 Bookie Bolin, American football offensive lineman
 Tim Bowens, American football defensive lineman

References

External links

Public high schools in Mississippi
Schools in Chickasaw County, Mississippi
Public middle schools in Mississippi